Events from the year 1597 in France

Incumbents
 Monarch – Henry IV

Events

Births
 January 31 – John Francis Regis, French saint (d. 1640)
 February 24 – Vincent Voiture, French poet (d. 1648)

Deaths

See also

References

1590s in France